The following is a bibliography of Cleveland, Ohio. It includes selected publications specifically about the city, Cuyahoga County, and the Greater Cleveland Metropolitan Area.

Nonfiction

History

List of works, arranged chronologically

Published in the 19th century

Published in the 20th century
 
 Orth, Samuel Peter. A History of Cleveland, Ohio: Biographical. Vol. 2 (SJ Clarke Publishing Company, 1910).  online
 

 Auburn, William H., and Miriam R. Auburn. 1933. This Cleveland of Ours. Cleveland: S.J. Clarke Publishing Co.
 
 
 
 
 
 
 
 
 
 
 
 
 
 Van Tassel, David, and John Grabowski, eds. Encyclopedia of Cleveland History  (1996).

Published in the 21st century
 
 Jenkins, William D. "Before Downtown Cleveland, Ohio, and Urban Renewal, 1949-1958." Journal of Urban History 27.4 (2001): 471–496.
 Tuennerman-Kaplan, Laura. Helping others, helping ourselves: Power, giving, and community identity in Cleveland, Ohio, 1880-1930 (Kent State University Press, 2001).
 
 
 
 
 Lamoreaux, Naomi R., Margaret Levenstein, and Kenneth L. Sokoloff. "Financing invention during the second industrial revolution: Cleveland, Ohio, 1870-1920." (No. w10923. National Bureau of Economic Research, 2004). online
 
 
 Keating, Dennis, Norman Krumholz, and Ann Marie Wieland. "Cleveland's Lakefront: Its Development and Planning." Journal of Planning History 4#2 (2005): 129–154.

Landmarks

Culture

Ethnicity
 
 
 
 
 
 
 Kukral, Michael A. "Czech Settlements in 19th Century Cleveland, Ohio." East European Quarterly 38.4 (2004): 473.
 
 
 
 
 
 Papp, Susan M. Hungarian Americans and Their Communities in Cleveland (1981) Complete text online
 
 
 Veronesi, Gene P. Italian-Americans & Their Communities of Cleveland (1977) Complete text online

Politics
 
 
 

 
 
 
 Miggins, Edward M. "A City of Uplifting Influences: From Sweet Charity to Modern Social Welfare and Philanthropy." In The Birth of Modern Cleveland, 1865-1930, edited by Thomas F. Campbell and Edward M. Miggins, (Western Reserve Historical Society, 1988) pp 141-71.

Mayor Tom Johnson
 Bremner, Robert H. "The Civic Revival in Ohio: Reformed Businessman: Tom L. Johnson." American Journal of Economics and Sociology 8.3 (1949): 299-309.
 DeMatteo, Arthur E. "The Downfall of a Progressive: Mayor Tom L. Johnson and the Cleveland Streetcar Strike of 1908." Ohio History 104 (1995): 24-41.

Johnson, Tom L.. My Story. B. W. Huebsch, 1911; reprint Kent State University Press 1993. Text also online at the  Cleveland Memory Project.
 Lough, Alexandra W. "Tom L. Johnson and Cleveland Traction Wars, 1901–1909." American Journal of Economics and Sociology 75.1 (2016): 149-192.

 Megery, Michael. "Ideological Origins of a Radical Democrat: The Early Political Thought of Tom L. Johnson, 1888–1895." Middle West Review 6.1 (2019): 37-61.
 Murdock, Eugene C. Tom Johnson of Cleveland (Wright State University Press, 1994), a standard scholarly biography.
 Suit, William Wilson. "Tom Loftin Johnson, businessman reformer' (PhD dissertation, Kent State University ProQuest Dissertations Publishing,  1988. 8827177).
 Warner, Hoyt Landon. Progressivism in Ohio, 1897-1917 (Ohio State University Press, 1964).
 Whitehair, Andrew L., "Tom L. Johnson’s Tax School: the Fight For Democracy And Control of Cleveland’s Tax Machinery" (2020). (ETD Archive. 1190. online

Fiction

See also
 List of mass media in Cleveland

External links
 Cleveland Public Library
 The Encyclopedia of Cleveland History at Case Western Reserve University
 Cleveland Memory Project at Cleveland State University

Cleveland
Cleveland-related lists
Cleveland
Cleveland